FC Chernomorets Novorossiysk is the oldest Russian association football club based in Novorossiysk. It plays in the third-tier FNL 2.

History
The club was founded as a part of the football section in the Olympia sports club (Novorossiysk) in the summer of 1907, and on September 30, 1907, the first international match between the Olympia club and the sailors of a merchant ship from England took place, the match ended in a draw 2:2. The Club changed name for Cement Novorossiysk in 1960 and was known by its name in 1960–1969 and 1978–1991. In 1970–1977 the clubs was called Trud Novorossiysk, in 1992–1993 Gekris Novorossiysk, and in 2005 FC Novorossiysk. Chernomorets is Russian for "a man from Black Sea".

The club played in class B of the Soviet football in 1960–1970. After this they did not participate in Soviet championships until 1978, when they entered the Second League. They played there until the dissolution of USSR, and in 1992 were entitled to enter the Russian First Division. They spent three years there. After a third place in 1992 they won their regional group in 1993, but did not succeed in the promotion-relegation tournament. A victory in the First Division in 1994 brought them automatic promotion.

Chernomorets stayed in the Top Division from 1995 to 2001. Their best result was sixth position in 1997 and 2000. The latter entitled them to a place in the UEFA Cup, where they were knocked out in the first round by Valencia.

In 2002 Chernomorets won promotion straight back, but were relegated again in 2003. After the 2004 season in the First Division, Chernomorets were denied a professional licence. The club was reorganized, renamed FC Novorossiysk and entered the Amateur Football League for the 2005 season. In the course of the season the team was renamed Chernomorets again. Chernomorets finished first in the South zone and went on to win the final tournament, becoming amateur champions of Russia. Chernomorets finished third in the South zone of Russian Second Division in the 2006 season. They finally finished first and were promoted to Russian First Division for the 2007 season. It stayed 2 seasons in First Division and relegated back to Second Division in 2009. They were promoted to the First Division again after winning the Second Division zone in 2010. It was relegated back from the First Division after one year on that level.

League results

Current squad
As of 20 February 2023, according to the official Second League website.

Reserve team
Chernomorets' reserve team played professionally in the Russian Second Division (in 2000 as FC Chernomorets-2 Novorossiysk) and the Russian Third League (in 1996 as FC Chernomorets-d Novorossiysk).

Notable players
Had international caps for their respective countries. Players whose name is listed in bold represented their countries while playing for Chernomorets/Tsement/Gekris.

USSR/Russia
 Boris Pozdnyakov
 Aleksei Berezutski
 Vladimir But
 Sergei Filippenkov
 Nikolay Komlichenko
 Oleg Kuzmin
 Denis Popov
 Oleg Teryokhin
 Yevgeni Varlamov

Former USSR countries
 Armen Adamyan
 Manuk Kakosyan
 Tigran Petrosyan
 Aramais Yepiskoposyan
 Lev Mayorov
 Vyacheslav Geraschenko
 Artem Kontsevoy
 Konstantin Kovalenko

 Vitali Lanko
 Mikhail Markhel
 Andrei Sosnitskiy
 Aleksandr Vyazhevich
 Besik Beradze
 Davit Janashia
 Klimenti Tsitaishvili
 Vadim Egoshkin
 Andrei Kurdyumov
 Maksim Nizovtsev
 Maksim Shevchenko
 Andrey Shkurin
 Jurijs Ševļakovs
 Nerijus Radžius
 Serghei Belous
 Serghei Clescenco
 Alexandr Covalenco
 Adrian Sosnovschi
 Oleksiy Antyukhyn
 Serhiy Bezhenar

 Yuriy Hrytsyna
 Oleksandr Kyryukhin
 Maxym Levitsky
 Oleksandr Pryzetko
 Serhiy Snytko
 Oleksandr Svystunov
 Mykola Volosyanko
 Jafar Irismetov
 Eduard Momotov
 Gennadiy Sharipov

Africa
 David Embé
 Alphonse Tchami
 Jerry-Christian Tchuissé
 Baba Adamu

South America
 Flávio

See also
FC Chernomorets Novorossiysk in Europe

References

External links
Official website 
Fans' website 

 
Football clubs in Russia
Sport in Novorossiysk
Association football clubs established in 1907
1907 establishments in the Russian Empire